Proviverra ("before civet") is an extinct genus of proviverid hyaenodont that lived during the Middle Eocene in Europe.

Phylogeny 
The phylogenetic relationships of genus Proviverra are shown in the following cladogram.

See also 
 Mammal classification
 Proviverridae

References 

Hyaenodonts
Eocene mammals of Europe
Prehistoric placental genera